Events in the year 2010 in Liberia.

Incumbents 

 President: Ellen Johnson Sirleaf
 Vice President: Joseph Boakai
 Chief Justice: Johnnie Lewis

Events
 February 26 – Clashes in Voinjama between Christian and Muslim communities result in the death of four people, eighteen people being injured, and the imposition of a curfew in Lofa County by the Liberian government.
 March 18 – United States President Barack Obama extends Deferred Enforcement Departure to Liberian nationals through September 2011.
 May 27 – The Gender Equity in Politics Act, which sought increase women's involvement in politics by mandating 30% of the elected officials to be women is proposed in the Legislature of Liberia.
 May 28 – Alleged Russian drug smuggler, Konstantin Yaroshenko, is arrested by Liberian authorities.
 June 29 – Liberia receives $4.6 billion of debt relief from the International Monetary Fund and the World Bank.
 July 26 – Catholic Prelate Robert Tikpor serves as the national Independence Day orator.
 September 15 – The United Nations Security Council extends the mandate of the United Nations Mission in Liberia by one year.
 September 16 – The Paris Club pardons $1.2 billion dollars of Liberia's debt.
 November 3 – President Sirleaf dismisses her cabinet.
 December 17 – The United Nations Security Council unanimously adopts resolution 1961, renewing its arms embargo on Liberia for a year.

Deaths
 August 19 – David D. Kpormakpor, former Chairman of the Interim Council of State and Supreme Court justice, in New York City, U. S. (b. 1935)

References 

 
2010s in Liberia
Years of the 21st century in Liberia
Liberia
Liberia